The following list of the magazines in the world by circulation is based upon the number of copies distributed, on average, for each issue.

Lists by continent and country 
The following are lists of magazines from selected countries/regions, sorted by overall circulation:

Asia 
This is a partial list of magazines from various Asian countries, sorted by their circulation, in first quarter (Q1) 2009:

India

Japan 

The following list presents the best-selling ten magazines in Japan from October 2014 to September 2015.

Europe

France 
The following list of French magazines is ranked according to their paid circulation from 2012 to 2013:

Germany 
The following list of German magazines is sorted by their circulation as of the third quarter (Q3) of 2012:

Netherlands 
The following list of Dutch magazines is ranked according to circulation figures:

Portugal 
The following list of Portuguese newspaper, magazines and books as of 2020:

Russia 
The following list of Russian magazines is ranked according to circulation figures:

Spain 
The following list of Spanish magazines are ranked according to circulation figures that are relevant as of 2010:

Sweden 
The following list of Swedish magazines are ranked according to their circulation figures:

United Kingdom 
The following list of 100 British magazines is ranked according to their circulation figures that are relevant as of the second half of 2013:

North America

Canada 
The following list of Canadian magazines is sorted by their circulation totals, as of the first half of 2012, according to data from the Alliance for Audited Media (then the Audit Bureau of Circulations):

United States 
The following list of American magazines is in accordance with their paid and non-paid circulation—as of 30 June 2016 
based on data from the Alliance for Audited Media:

Consumer Reports is unaudited, but reported approximately 3.8 million subscribers as of April 2016.

Oceania

Australia 
The following list of Australian magazines have been sorted according to circulation data that is relevant as of December 2012:

New Zealand 
This is a list of New Zealand magazines, ranked according to circulation figures:

See also 
 Alliance for Audited Media (US)
 Audit Bureau of Circulations (Hong Kong)
 Japan Audit Bureau of Circulations
 Audit Bureau of Circulations (India)
 Alliance for Audited Media, formerly known as Audit Bureau of Circulations (North America)
 Audit Bureau of Circulations (UK)
 Audit Bureau of Circulations (Norway) 
 Audit Bureau of Circulations (Germany)
 International Federation of Audit Bureaux of Circulations
 List of magazines
 List of music magazines
 Newspaper circulation
 South African Audience Research Foundation

References

External links 
 International Federation of Audit Bureaux of Circulations
 Audit Bureau of Circulations (New Zealand)
 World Association of Magazine Media
 Associação Portuguesa para o Controlo de Tiragem e Circulação (Portugal)

 
Magazines